MS Baltic Queen is a cruiseferry owned by the Estonia-based ferry operator Tallink.  The ship was built by the STX Europe shipyard in Rauma, Finland.

Starting from 16 September 2020 and ending on 5 January 2021 MS Baltic Queen will serve the route Helsinki-Riga.

Concept and construction
Initially known under the project name Cruise 5, Baltic Queen was ordered from (what was then) Aker Yards shipyard in Rauma, Finland in April 2007. The ship's planned route was a mystery to the general public for a long time, until on 11 November 2008 Tallink revealed that she would be placed on the Tallinn–Stockholm service on completion. The ship was launched from drydock and officially named Baltic Queen on 5 December 2008. By this time the shipyard had been renamed STX Europe. Tallink took delivery of the ship on 16 April 2009.

Service history

Baltic Queen entered service on the Tallinn–Mariehamn–Stockholm route on 24 April 2009, replacing Tallink's first newbuilt ship , which was moved to the Riga–Stockholm service. Baltic Queens Tallink Silja fleetmate  encountered problems with her steering on 22 November 2009, and she had to be taken out of service for repairs. As a result, the Baltic Queen was moved to the Turku–Mariehamn–Stockholm service as a temporary replacement from 26 November until 11 December 2009. From 7 August 2014 the ship started sailing from Tallinn to Helsinki, because MS Silja Europa was chartered to an Australian company due to its high fuel costs. MS Baltic Queen was then replaced with MS Romantika on the Tallinn-Mariehamn-Stockholm line. At the end of 2018 once again it is on the Tallinn–Mariehamn–Stockholm route.

References

External links

 Tallink official website
 Baltic Queen at marinetraffic.com

Ferries of Estonia
Ships built in Rauma, Finland
Cruiseferries
2008 ships